Hokejaški klub Spartak is an ice hockey club from Subotica, Serbia, currently playing in the Serbian Hockey League. It has a few tiers - juniors and adults.  The club is a part of the SD Spartak Subotica sports association.

History 
Hockey in Subotica was played before World War II. Back then it was played on the nearby Palić Lake when it was frozen in winter. Club was founded in 1939 under the name SK Palić and as part of SDŽ Spartak in 1945. The first championship match was played in 1941. The construction of artificial ice, since 1969 has helped development of the club. The club has played in the Yugoslav Hockey League, and afterwards in the Serbian Hockey League. However, it has not play in every season due to various difficulties - number of players and finances for example.

Honours

Serbian Hockey League:
Runners-up (4): 1992, 1993, 2000, 2010

References

External links 
 Future look of Spartak hockey ground

Ice hockey teams in Serbia
Sport in Subotica
Serbian Hockey League teams
Yugoslav Ice Hockey League teams
1947 establishments in Serbia
Ice hockey clubs established in 1947